Events from the year 1738 in art.

Events
 Louis-François Roubiliac's sculpture of George Frederick Handel goes on display at Vauxhall Gardens in London.

Paintings

 Jean-Baptiste-Siméon Chardin – The Wash Barrel
 Louis de Silvestre – Portrait of the Princess Maria Amalia of Saxony in Polish costume
 Jean-Baptiste van Loo – Portrait of William Murray

Births
 January 3 – Johann Friedrich Bause, German engraver (died 1814)
 June 4 – George III of the United Kingdom, patron of the arts and collector (died 1820)
 June 10 – Hubert Maurer, Austrian painter of portraits and religious themes (died 1818)
 July William Wynne Ryland, English engraver (died 1783)
 August 6 – Johann Balzer, Czech etcher and engraver (died 1799)
 October 10 – Benjamin West, painter (died 1820)
 December 20 – Claude Michel, French sculptor in the Rococo style (died 1814)
 date unknown
 William Cochran, Scottish portrait painter both in oil and miniature (died 1785)
 Antoine Raspal, French painter (died 1811)
 Camillo Tinti, Italian painter (died unknown)
 Fredrika Eleonora von Düben, Swedish textile artist, member of the Royal Swedish Academy of Arts (died 1808)

Deaths
 January 20 – Francesco Galli Bibiena, Italian architect/designer/painter (born 1659)
 January 27 – Alessandro Marchesini, Italian painter of allegories with small figures (born 1664)
 February 16 – Carel de Moor, Dutch etcher and painter (born 1655)
 August 9 – Pierre Drevet, French portrait engraver (born 1663)
 October 5 – Antonio Amorosi, Italian painter, active in Ascoli Piceno and Rome (born 1660)
 November – Giovanni Enrico Vaymer, Italian portrait painter (born 1665)
 November 18 – Hendrick Krock, Danish history painter (born 1671)

 date unknown
 Felice Cappelletti, Italian painter of the late-Baroque period active in Verona (born 1698)
 Giovanni Battista Cassana, Italian painter of fruit, flowers, and still-life (born 1668)
 Edme Jeaurat, French engraver (born 1688)
 Carlo Antonio Tavella, Italian painter of landscapes (born 1668)

 
Years of the 18th century in art
1730s in art